Radosław Mroczkowski (born 4 November 1967) is a Polish football manager.

Career
Mroczkowski managed Widzew Łódź in the Ekstraklasa between 2011 and 2013. He joined Sandecja Nowy Sącz during the 2015–16 season, and was dismissed in December 2017.

Mroczkowski replaced Franciszek Smuda as Widzew's manager in June 2018.

References

External links
Radoslaw Mroczkowski at Footballdatabase

1967 births
Living people
Sportspeople from Łódź Voivodeship
Polish football managers
People from Poddębice County
Widzew Łódź managers
Ząbkovia Ząbki managers
Raków Częstochowa managers
Sandecja Nowy Sącz managers
Zagłębie Sosnowiec managers
Ekstraklasa managers
I liga managers
II liga managers